Bogdan Popa (born 8 March 1984 in Arad, Romania) is a  Romanian aerobic gymnast. He won one gold world championships medal and one bronze European championships medal on the group event.

References

External links
Federation Internationale de Gymnastique Profiles: Bogdan Popa

1984 births
Living people
Romanian aerobic gymnasts
Male aerobic gymnasts
Medalists at the Aerobic Gymnastics World Championships
Sportspeople from Arad, Romania